Oakwood Cemetery Chapel is a historic chapel on Arbor Street in Allegan, Michigan. It was built in 1920 and added to the National Register in 1987.

History
Alexander L. Ely, one of Allegan's early proprietors, gave the land for Oakwood Cemetery to the city early in the city's history. The original tract was added onto in 1873. In 1920, the cemetery hired E. Haines to construct this building.

Description
The Oakwood Chapel is a brown brick building with a hipped roof that extends outward from the building to form a porte cochere. The building has Gothic windows with raised brick, and contains an office, a crypt, and the main chapel.

Cemetery
Oakwood Cemetery itself is the burial place of US Congressmen Clare Eugene Hoffman (1875–1967) and William Brewster Williams (1826–1905) and Civil War general Benjamin Dudley Pritchard (1835–1907).

References

External links
 

Churches in Michigan
Properties of religious function on the National Register of Historic Places in Michigan
Churches completed in 1920
Buildings and structures in Allegan County, Michigan
National Register of Historic Places in Allegan County, Michigan